The City of Ballarat is a local government area in the west of the state of Victoria, Australia. It is primarily urban with the vast majority of its population living in the Greater Ballarat urban area, while other significant settlements within the LGA include Buninyong, Waubra, Learmonth and Addington. It was formed in 1994 from the amalgamation of the City of Ballarat, Shire of Ballarat, Borough of Sebastopol and parts of the Shire of Bungaree, Shire of Buninyong, Shire of Grenville and Shire of Ripon.

The City is governed and administered by the Ballarat City Council; its seat of local government and administrative centre is located at the council headquarters in Ballarat, it also has a service centre located in Buninyong. The City is named after the main urban settlement lying in the centre-south of the LGA, Ballarat, which is also the LGA's most populous urban area with a population of 105,471.

Council

Current composition

The council is composed of three wards and nine councillors, with three councillors per ward elected to represent each ward.
The current Council, elected in 2020, in order of election by ward, is:

Election Results

2020 Election

North Ward

Central Ward

South Ward

2016 election

North Ward

Central Ward

South Ward

Administration and governance
The council meets in the council chambers at the council headquarters in the Ballarat Town Hall Offices, which is also the location of the council's administrative activities. It also provides customer services at both its administrative centre in Ballarat, and its service centre in Buninyong.

The council's main offices are in a modern extension behind the Town Hall called The Phoenix. In 2009 the council voted to move to a new headquarters at Civic Hall on Mair Street, which would turn the heritage listed Town Hall building into a public general purpose venue.

Townships and localities
The 2021 census, the city had a population of 113,763 up from 101,686 in the 2016 census

^ - Territory divided with another LGA
* - Not noted in 2016 Census

Sister cities 
The City of Ballarat's sister cities are:

 Inagawa, Hyōgo, Japan
 Ainaro, East Timor

See also 
 List of localities (Victoria)
 Ballarat

References

External links 
Ballarat City Council official website
Metlink local public transport map
Link to Land Victoria interactive maps

Local government areas of Victoria (Australia)
Grampians (region)
 
Ballarat